is a Japanese shot putter.

She finished eighth at the 1999 World Indoor Championships and fourth at the 2005 Asian Championships. She also competed at the World Championships in 2005 and 2007 without reaching the finals.

Her personal best throw is 17.57 metres, achieved in June 2004 in Tottori.

References

1977 births
Living people
Japanese female shot putters
Asian Games competitors for Japan
Athletes (track and field) at the 2002 Asian Games
World Athletics Championships athletes for Japan
Japan Championships in Athletics winners
Australian Athletics Championships winners
21st-century Japanese women